Ramboldia curvispora is a species of crustose lichen in the family Ramboldiaceae. Found in Australia, it was described as a new species in 2017 by lichenologists John Elix and Patrick McCarthy. The type specimen was collected from Callala Bay (South Coast of New South Wales), where it was found on a vertical shale cliff subject to sea spray and surface runoff from the top of the cliff. The specific epithet refers to its characteristic curved ascospores. The lichen is only known to occur on the South Coast of New South Wales, where it grows on both hard and soft siliceous rocks.

References

Lecanorales
Lichen species
Lichens described in 2017
Lichens of Australia
Taxa named by John Alan Elix